A Kiss as Long as Eternity (Поцелуй длиною в вечность) is a Russian album by Vitas (Витас), released in 2004. The album sold over 2 million copies within the first 6 months of its release. Vitas wrote the songs Mantra, I Believe In Love and Internet Mood himself, and A Kiss as Long as Eternity, Half Night, Half Day, Heartbeat, In Shorts and a T-shirt and Streets Of The Capital in collaboration with other songwriters. Unusually for Vitas' own compositions, he makes little use of high-pitched vocals on this album: one reviewer remarked "It was... delightful to find his baritone and bass richer and smoother than before."

Track listing

References

External links
 Official Site
 English translations of lyrics

Vitas albums
2004 albums